Helicia nortoniana, also named Norton's silky oak, is a species of rainforest trees, of northeastern Queensland, Australia, from the flowering plant family Proteaceae.

It is endemic to the rainforests of the Wet Tropics region, from sea level to around  altitude.

References

nortoniana
Flora of Queensland
Endemic flora of Australia
Proteales of Australia